Eidsvatnet is a lake on the border of the municipalities of Høylandet and Overhalla in Trøndelag county, Norway. The lake empties into the river Bjøra which flows a short distance into the large river Namsen.

See also
List of lakes in Norway

References

Lakes of Trøndelag
Overhalla
Høylandet